Swetman is a surname. Notable people with the surname include: 

Nick Swetman (born 1984), Welsh cricketer
Ralph Waldo Swetman (1886–1957), American educator
Roy Swetman (born 1933), English cricketer

See also
Swetman House, a building in Seward, Alaska, US
Swetman Island, an island in Lake Ontario, south of Picton, Canada